Nripendra Malla was a Malla ruler and the ninth king of Kantipur. He succeeded his father Pratap Malla in 1674 as the King of Kantipur.

Reign 
Nripendra Malla's father Pratap Malla wanted his brother Mahipatendra Malla to reign as King after his death. But, due to neighboring kingdoms' concern about the line of succession, Mahipatendra Malla had to yield to his elder brother Nripendra Malla, and Parthibendra Malla. The Kingdom of Patan played an important role in installing Nripendra Malla as the king of Kantipur.

Nripendra Malla was an insignificant king and the real control of the kingdom was exercised by Parthibendra Malla. In fact, the Vamshavalis (genealogy) do not even mention Nripendra Malla being a king. However, coins minted in his name, and documents addressing him with royal titles have been found which establishes that he succeeded his father immediately after his father's death.

He died in 1680 and was succeeded by his brother Parthibendra Malla.

References 

Malla rulers of Kantipur
Year of birth unknown
17th-century Nepalese people

Nepalese monarchs
1680 deaths